At least three ships of the Hellenic Navy have borne the name Amfitriti, after the ancient Greek sea goddess Amphitrite:

  a U-class submarine launched as HMS Upstart in 1942 she was renamed on transfer to Greece in 1945. She was returned to the Royal Navy in 1952 and sunk as a target in 1959.
  a  launched as USS Jack in 1942 she was renamed on transfer to Greece in 1958. She was returned to the United States Navy in 1967 and sunk as a target.
  a Type 209 submarine commissioned in 1979.

Hellenic Navy ship names